{{safesubst:#invoke:RfD|||month = March
|day = 15
|year = 2023
|time = 09:09
|timestamp = 20230315090944

|content=
REDIRECT Anagenesis

}}